Discordia seyrigalis is a species of snout moth in the genus Discordia. It was described by Hubert Marion and Pierre Viette in 1956 and is known from Madagascar.

References

Moths described in 1956
Pyralinae
Moths of Madagascar